The Mixed 4 × 400 metres relay at the 2021 IAAF World U20 Championships was held at the Kasarani Stadium on 18 August.

Records
The event of 4×400m mixed relay was put for the first time in World Athletics U20 Championships in 2021. Therefore, there was no Championship Record earlier.

Results

Heats 
Qualification: First 3 of each heat ( Q ) plus the 2 fastest times ( q ) qualified for the final.

Final 
The final was held on 18 August at 17:15.

References 

4 x 400 metres relay
Relays at the World Athletics U20 Championships
U20